Annals of Human Biology is a bimonthly academic journal that publishes review articles on human population biology, nature, development and causes of human variation. It is published by Taylor & Francis on behalf of the Society for the Study of Human Biology, of which it is the official journal.

Coverage Includes 

 Global health
 Ageing
 Epidemiology
 Ecology
 Environmental physiology
 Human genetics
 Auxology
 Population biology

Society
Annals of Human Biology is the official journal of the Society for the Study of Human Biology

Editors-in-Chief 
Noël Cameron, Olga Rickards, and Babette Zemel are the Editors-in-Chief of Annals of Human Biology.

Publication Format 
Annals of Human Biology publishes six issues per year in simultaneous print and online editions.

References

External links
Annals of Human Biology homepage of Annals of Human Biology
Society for the Study of Human Biology

Publications established in 1974
Human biology journals
Taylor & Francis academic journals
Bimonthly journals
English-language journals